Small Swords Society or Small Knife Society was a political and military organisation active in Shanghai, China, and neighbouring areas amid the Taiping Rebellion, between about 1840 and 1855. Members of the society, rebelling against the Qing dynasty, occupied old Shanghai and many of the surrounding villages. Chinese gentry and merchants took refuge in the British and French concessions, which were regarded as the only safe places. The rebellion was suppressed and the society expelled from Shanghai in February 1855.

History

The organization was founded in 1850 during the upheavals leading to the Taiping Rebellion, its original leader being a Singaporean-born merchant with British citizenship, Chen Qingzhen, in Xiamen, Fujian Province, many among its leadership also being English-speaking Singapore Chinese. It was one of a number of rebel groups to arise during this period, either affiliated with or proclaiming support for the Taiping administration. The name ("Small Swords") refers to daggers used by warriors or martial artists in close combat. It is believed to be linked to triads. The society consisted mainly of natives from Guangdong and Fujian, including Li Shaoqing, Li Xianyun and Pan Yiguo, directors of some of the huiguan or native place associations of Shanghai. They were opposed to both Buddhism and Daoism, issuing proclamations against both faiths. Some of these proclamations were translated for an English-speaking audience by Alexander Wylie. The Small Swords Society was a variant of the Heaven and Earth Societies (Tiandihui) that organised the  Red Turban Rebellion in Guangdong province, and used their symbolism.

The Society succeeded in seizing Xiamen, Tong'an, Zhangzhou, and Zhangpu in Fujian province, but was forced to withdraw after heavy fighting, continuing resistance at sea until 1858. While in Xiamen, they allied with forces of the Red Turban Rebellion in Humen to seize the city of Huizhou, near Guangzhou, Guangdong province, helping to galvanise that insurrection.

In 1851 the Society occupied the Chinese city of Shanghai without invading the foreign concessions. The circuit intendant was forced to flee. Large numbers of Chinese refugees from surrounding areas flooded into the foreign concessions in this period, dramatically increasing the population there and giving rise to the prevalent longtang or shikumen-style housing which came to dominate Shanghai by the early 20th Century.

The Society's headquarters were in the Yu Garden of Shanghai, at the heart of the old city and today a popular tourist attraction and shopping district. There is a small museum displaying artefacts of the Society in the gardens.

The Small Sword Society in Shanghai initially declared the re-establishment of Da Ming Guo, the Great Ming State, and elected Liu Lichuan as leader, who wrote to the Heavenly King of the Taiping Tianguo to join his rebellion, subsequently adopting the Taiping Tianguo name. The society took steps to issue currency, encourage trade and stabilise the food supply.

Conflict broke out between the Fujian and Guangdong factions, over whether they should leave with the loot they had acquired. At first, the British and American authorities remained neutral, while the French supported the imperial government. However, some British and American sailors joined up with the Small Swords Society. When French troops were sent in to support Qing imperial troops, this caused the situation of Westerners fighting Westerners. The British and American authorities then declared the sailors' actions illegal and joined in support for the imperial armies. The society's forces tried to break out from the siege but was destroyed in February 1855. Remnant forces regrouped with the Taiping army.

References 

Military units and formations established in the 1850s
Rebel groups in China
19th century in Shanghai
Rebellions in the Qing dynasty
19th century in China
19th-century conflicts